Virgil Hill vs. Thomas Hearns was a professional boxing match contested on June 3, 1991, for the WBA light heavyweight title.

Background
At the end of 1990 undefeated WBA light heavyweight champion Virgil Hill had agreed to terms to face five-division champion Thomas Hearns. The fight, which was promoted by the Jerry Buss-led Great Western Forum and originally set for May 17, 1991 faced issues due to Hill's questionable marketability as while he had become one of boxing's top fighters, he had not headlined a pay-per-view up to that point. As such, the fight was delayed until June 3 in hopes that the fight would find a bigger pay-per-view audience.

The now 32-year old Hearns had initially planned his next fight to be against rival Sugar Ray Leonard, with Hearns stating that a third fight against Leonard was "imminent" and that it "must happen. I can't go on to the next fight until this one has been resolved." But a dispute over the fights catchweight led Hearns to instead take the fight with Hill. The Hill fight would be Hearns' first without his longtime trainer and manager Emanuel Steward; the two had parted ways the previous year after Steward claimed they had disagreed about whether or not Hearns should retire.

The fight
Despite coming into the fight as 2½ to 1 underdog, Hearns would ultimately earn a unanimous decision victory with one score of 116–112 and two scores of 115–113 to earn his sixth and final world title. Hill basically fought with one hand as a hyperextended right elbow suffered during training prevented him from using his right hand effectively while Hearns dominated with his left jab. Despite, Hill's injury, the fight was more or less even at the mid-point of the fight before Hearns pulled away by taking four of the last six rounds on all three of the judge's scorecards.

Fight card

References

1991 in boxing
Boxing matches
1991 in sports in Nevada
Boxing in Las Vegas
June 1991 sports events in the United States